Teheran is a 1946 British-Italian thriller film co-directed by Giacomo Gentilomo and William Freshman. It stars Derek Farr as Pemberton Grant, a British intelligence officer who discovers a plot to assassinate the President of the United States Franklin D. Roosevelt at the Tehran Conference during the Second World War. It also featured Marta Labarr, Manning Whiley and Pamela Stirling. It was also released under the alternative titles Appointment in Persia and The Plot to Kill Roosevelt and Conspiracy in Teheran.

It was shot at the Scalera Studios in Rome.

Plot
In 1943, Churchill, Stalin and Roosevelt meet at the Tehran conference to agree plans for the Allied invasion of Europe. Whilst attempting to trace  ballerina Natalie Trubetzin (Marta Labarr), who he met before the outbreak of war, British journalist Pemberton Grant (Derek Farr) uncovers a deadly conspiracy. The plot, led by Paul Sherek (Manning Whiley), involves international arms dealers, who can't afford to, and do not wish to have peace declared, and plan to blow up President Roosevelt during his visit.

Partial cast
 Derek Farr as Pemberton Grant 
 Marta Labarr as Natalie  
 Manning Whiley as Paul Sherek 
 Pamela Stirling as Haali 
 Philip Ridgeway as Mr Razed 
 John Warwick as Maor 'Mack' MacIntyre
 John Slater as Maor Sergei Soviesky
 MacDonald Parke as Major Wellman

Critical reception
The Radio Times called the film a "shambolic British thriller"; TV Guide wrote, "Whiley's performance alone provides some semblance of acting, and the technical end is almost totally incompetent"; but Allmovie wrote, "Even though the audience knows the outcome, there's thrills aplenty in The Plot to Kill Roosevelt."

See also
 Operation Long Jump

References

External links

1946 films
1940s thriller films
Films about assassinations
Films directed by Giacomo Gentilomo
Films set in Tehran
Films set in Rome
Films shot at Scalera Studios
World War II spy films
British black-and-white films
Italian black-and-white films
British thriller films
Films scored by Enzo Masetti
1940s English-language films
1940s British films
1940s Italian films